Shashil Gangadhar Namoshi is an Indian politician who is the current member of the Karnataka Legislative Council, from North East Teachers Constituency from 10 November 2020.

References

1956 births
Living people
Members of the Karnataka Legislative Council
People from Kalaburagi
Bharatiya Janata Party politicians from Karnataka